Lecanophora is a genus of flowering plants belonging to the family Malvaceae.

Its native range is Argentina to Southern Chile.

Species:

Lecanophora ameghinoi 
Lecanophora chubutensis 
Lecanophora ecristata 
Lecanophora heterophylla 
Lecanophora jarae 
Lecanophora ruiz-lealii 
Lecanophora subacaulis

References

Malvaceae
Malvaceae genera